Lycorma is a genus of planthoppers native to Asia. The first species within the genus was described by Frederick William Hope in 1843 and the genus was formally established by Carl Stål in 1863.

L. delicatula, known as the spotted lanternfly, is an invasive species in the United States, Japan, and South Korea.

Discovery and taxonomy 
The genus Lycorma is in the planthopper family Fulgoridae, subfamily Aphaeninae. Species within this genus are native to Asia. Frederick William Hope, in 1843, described Lystra punicea (now a subspecies of L. imperialis), the first named species of the clade. In 1845, Adam White classified two new species under the genus Aphaena, Aphaena imperialis and Aphaena delicatula. White described the species as similar to Aphaena variegata, another planthopper species native to Asia, and referenced prior descriptions by George Tradescant Lay in his initial classification of the lanternflies.

Between 1846 and 1863, the species was reclassified by both John O. Westwood and Francis Walker. In 1863, the genus Lycorma was formally established by Carl Stål, with Lycorma imperialis designated as the type species.  In 1929, Masayo Kato described two additional Lycorma species in Taiwan: L. meliae and L. olivacea. Additional reclassifications and renamings of subspecies occurred through the work of Edwin Felix Thomas Atkinson, William Lucas Distant, and Robert L. Metcalf, and presently four species and three subspecies are recognized by most authorities.

The name Lycorma derives from the Latin lyc/lyco, meaning "lamp". Members of this genus are often referred to colloquially as "lanternfly" or "lantern bug" due to their brightly colored hind wings. L. delicatula (often called the spotted lanternfly) has received a number of different colloquial names because it is invasive in South Korea, the United States, and Japan.

Species 
Fulgoromorpha Lists on the Web and the Catalogue of Life list the following:
 Lycorma delicatula (White, 1845)
 Lycorma delicatula jole Stål, 1863 (synonym  Lycorma jole Stål, 1863)
Lycorma delicatula operosa Walker,1858 (synonym Lycorma operosa  Walker, 1858)
 Lycorma imperialis (White, 1845) (type species)
 Lycorma imperialis punicea (Hope 1843) (synonym Lycorma punicea (Hope 1843))
 Lycorma meliae Kato, 1929
 Lycorma olivacea Kato, 1929

Distribution and evolution

Native range 
The genus Lycorma is originally native to parts of China, Taiwan, Bangladesh, and India. Surveys in the 1930s found that L. delicatula is native to China's northern provinces of Shanxi, Shandong and Hebei, and has been used in traditional Chinese medicine since the 1100s. As of 2020, it has expanded its range to include Anhui, Beijing, Guangdong, Henan, Jiangsu, Sichuan, Yunnan and Zhejiang. L. delicatula has also been reported in Taiwan, Vietnam, and India, but ongoing research has yet to conclude if the species is native to these regions. L. imperialis is native to China, Bangladesh, and India, specifically the Assam, Darjeeling, and Sikkim regions. L. meliae and L. olivacea are native solely to Taiwan.

Phylogeny 
The following cladogram shows the phylogenetic position of Lycorma among select genera of the Fulgoridae family:

Accidental introduction 

In 2006, L. delicatula was discovered to have invasively spread to South Korea. In 2009, L. delicatula was discovered in Japan, and in 2014, the species was discovered in the United States. Research has indicated that L. delicatula may have previously entered Japan sporadically since the 1930s, but only achieved a stable population in the early 2000s. It is believed that L. delicatula entered these countries via egg masses that were laid on exported goods. Currently, these countries have implemented pest control efforts which have sought to limit population growth and spread, due to the threat L. delicatula poses to global agricultural industries.

References

External links
 
 

Aphaeninae
Auchenorrhyncha genera
Taxa named by Carl Stål